Shamsabad (also Romanized as Shamsābād) is a village in Tirjerd Rural District, in the Central District of Abarkuh County, Yazd Province, Iran. At the 2006 census, its population was 740, in 191 families.

References 

Populated places in Abarkuh County